Chou Bun Eng (born 10 April 1956) is a Cambodian politician and a long-time member of the ruling Cambodian People's Party and Secretary of State of Ministry of Interior.

Secretary of State (2008–present)

National Committee for Counter Trafficking (in person)
In 2009, Chou Bun Eng has been assigned as the fore front government official to combat human trafficking by taking place as the permanence vise chair of the National Committee for Counter Trafficking.
In late 2016 she is actively coordinate government inter-ministerial to answer to the illegal surrogate babies business.

Personal and family life

Marriages and children
Ran Serey Leakhena (born Oct 1, 1979), government official

References

External links 

 Profile of Her Excellency Chou Bun Eng (video)
 Chou Bun Eng's Facebook 

1956 births
Cambodian People's Party politicians
Living people
Government ministers of Cambodia
Women government ministers of Cambodia
21st-century Cambodian women politicians
21st-century Cambodian politicians